Top Model po-ukrainsky, cycle 4 is the fourth season of Top Model po-ukrainsky. In contrast to the previous three seasons, the show introduced a division of also male models have a change of winning the competition.

The winner of the competition was 19-year-old Samvel Tumanyan. As part of his prizes, he received: a contracts with K Models, a cash prize of 100,000₴, and a trip to New York City. Beside, he and Vika will have the opportunity to star on the cover of Pink Magazine in Ukraine.

Anastasiya Panova, Ira Moysak, Vika Rogalchuk and Liza Doronko would later return to compete for the tile in Top Model po-ukrainsky, cycle 7. Liza Doronko was eliminated in Episode 1. Anastasiya Panova was eliminated in Episode 3. Vika Rogalchuk was eliminated in Episode 6. Ira Moysak was eliminated in Episode 9.

Contestants 
(ages stated are at start of contest)

Episodes

Episode 1
Original airdate: 

This was the first casting episode.

Episode 2
Original airdate: 

Best photo: Masha Shevchenko
Immune: Awa Prigoda & Liza Doronko
Bottom two: Danylo Zolotov & Karina Krilyuk
Eliminated: Karina Krilyuk

Episode 3
Original airdate: 

Challenge winner/Immune: Stone Pistry
Best photo: Danylo Zolotov
Bottom two: Dima Zabolotsky & Svyat Boyko
Eliminated: Dima Zabolotsky

Episode 4
Original airdate: 

Immune: Stone Pistry
Best photo: Misha Kukharchuk
Bottom four: Danylo Zolotov, Ira Simchich, Maks Sosnovsky & Vika Rogalchuk
Eliminated: Ira Simchich

Episode 5
Original airdate: 

Immune: Stone Pistry
Quit: Misha Kukharchuk
Bottom two:  Awa Prigoda & Vlad Dunayev
Eliminated: Vlad Dunayev

Episode 6
Original airdate: 

Bottom two: Nastya Panova & Danylo Zolotov
Eliminated: Nastya Panova

Episode 7
Original airdate: 

Immune: Vika Rogalchuk
Bottom two: Maks Sosnovsky & Liza Doronko
Eliminated: Liza Doronko

Episode 8
Original airdate: 

Immune: Ira Moysak
Bottom two: Stone Pistry and Samvel Tumanyan
Eliminated: None

Episode 9
Original airdate: 

Bottom two: Awa Prigoda & Masha Shevchenko
Eliminated: Awa Prigoda

Episode 10
Original airdate: 

Eliminated outside of judging panel: Ira Moysak
Bottom two: Maks Sosnovsky & Stone Pistry
Eliminated: Maks Sosnovsky

Episode 11
Original airdate: 

Bottom two: Danylo Zolotov & Masha Shevchenko
Eliminated: Danylo Zolotov

Episode 12
Original airdate: 

Bottom two: Dima Kharlamov & Revan Palyukh
Eliminated: None

Episode 13
Original airdate: 

Bottom four: Nastya Gladchenko, Dima Kharlamov, Revan Palyukh & Stone Pistry
Eliminated: Nastya Gladchenko & Dima Kharlamov

Episode 14
Original airdate: 
Immune from elimination: Samvel Tumanyan
Eliminated: Masha Shevchenko

Episode 15
Original airdate: 

Bottom two: Stone Pistry & Vika Rogalchuk
Eliminated: Stone Pistry

Episode 16
Original airdate: 

Bottom two: Olena Feofanova & Samvel Tumanyan
Eliminated: Olena Feofanova

Episode 17
Original airdate: 

Eliminated outside of judging panel: Revan Palyukh
Eliminated: Svyat Boyko

Episode 18
Original airdate: 

Final two: Samvel Tumanyan & Vika Rogalchuk
Eliminated: Vika Rogalchuk
Ukraine's Next Top Model: Samvel Tumanyan

: This elimination round was unusual because Samvel and Stone compete as the best models of this week.
: Originally, Masha and Olena were the bottom two, but due to Masha injured her leg, judges decided not to make a "second chance" (because it was connected with footwork). That's why, Masha was eliminated and Olena was safe.

Summaries

Results

 The contestant was eliminated outside of judging panel
 The contestant was eliminated
 The contestant quit the competition
 The contestant was in the bottom two.
 The contestant was immune from elimination
 The contestant won the competition

Photo shoot guide 
Episode 2 photo shoot: Bath, Madhouse killers
Episode 3 photo shoot: Chess pieces in pairs 
Episode 4 photo shoots: Spyers, Insects caught in a spider web; car crash victims
Episode 5 photo shoot: Posing with animals in enclosed spaces
Episode 6 photo shoots: Podolyan lookbook; cancer victims
Episode 8 photo shoot: Posing nude on a bus
Episode 9 motion shoot: Motion editorial
Episode 10 photo shoots: Aliens vs humans; comic book robbers; gender swap
Episode 11 photo shoot: Executions
Episode 12 photo shoots: Posing as animals from the primal Zodiac; Funsies campaign at a pool party
Episode 13 photo shoots: Posing in shadows; embodying critters
Episode 14 photo shoot: The rules of safe swimming, Posing at the side of a plane
Episode 15 photo shoot: With children,Campaign against domestic violence
Episode 16 photo shoot: Portraying African Gods/Goddesses, underwater orchestra
Episode 17 photo shoots: Colonial Style; Posing on a windmill; BDSM-styled with Alla Kostromichova

External links
Official website

Ukraine
2017 Ukrainian television seasons